Manaia is a rural town in South Taranaki District, New Zealand. Ōpunake is 29 km to the northwest, and Hāwera is 13 km to the southeast. Kaponga is 15 km north. State Highway 45 passes through the town. Manaia is named after the former Māori chief of the district, Hukunui Manaia.

The population was 960 in the 2013 Census, an increase of 36 from 2006.

History and culture

Māori history
The mouth of the Kapuni River was the site of two pā settled by Ngāti Ruanui in the 1800s: Orangi-tuapeka Pā on the western banks and Waimate Pā on the east. Orangi-tuapeka Pā was occupied by Wiremu Kīngi Moki Te Matakātea in 1833 and 1834, where he defeated Waikato Tainui forces led by Pōtatau Te Wherowhero, ending Waikato raids into Taranaki. In October 1834, the area was bombarded by British troops aboard the HMS Alligator, in an attempt to rescue Betty Guard, a whaler's wife. After the hostages were released, the British troops attacked and burnt the settlements.

After the ceasefire at the end of the First Taranaki War, a hui of over 1,000 Māori was held on 3 July 1861 at a meeting house called Aotearoa, close to Waimate Pā. There, over a thousand members of Taranaki, Ngāti Ruanui, Ngā Rauru and Whanganui iwi discussed the war, with most members pledging support for the Kīngitanga Movement.

European settlement

Manaia's history is still visible in the Manaia Redoubt. Built around 1880 on the site of a former pā (Te Takahe) during peacetime, this redoubt and wooden watchtower was created for the passive resistance of the Parihaka chief, Te Whiti o Rongomai, and his followers.

The wooden watchtower (35 feet high) was blown down in a storm and replaced in 1912 by a concrete one still standing today amidst the 18-hole golf course surrounded by two original blockhouses. Trenches surround the tower and blockhouses. The complex could house 160 men and all the timber used for the construction was pit sawn locally by the constables. The golf course is one of the oldest in Taranaki, established around 1905.

When driving into Manaia from Hāwera the remains of the old flour mill can be seen on the left hand side. These concrete remains of the mill were built in 1900 to replace the original wooden mill built in 1882 by Mr D. F. McVicar of the Sentry Hill flour mill, New Plymouth. The local Waiokura River powered the mill by a  water wheel which developed . The mill had 4 stories, and a  stud. About  of timber was used and the building provided storage for about 15,000 sacks of flour. employs around 250 people, and has been the main business in Manaia since 1923. The company manufactures fresh and frozen breads and bakery products. Its clients include Foodstuffs, Subway, and Pams. The company went into receivership in 2011.

Modern history

In 2007, a 9-year-old Jack Russell terrier called George (dog) died protecting 5 local children from an attack by two pit bulls . He was given a posthumous PDSA Gold Medal, the animal equivalent of the George Cross, at a special ceremony in Manaia in February 2009. The town has also erected a statue in his honour.

Marae

Manaia has three marae affiliated with the local Ngāruahine hapū of Ngāti Haua: Tawhitinui Marae and Okare Tuatoru meeting house, Waiokura Marae and Paraukau Tukau meeting house, and Okare ki Uta|Okare ki Uta Marae.

Demographics

The population of Manaia was 984 in the 2018 New Zealand census, an increase of 18 (1.9%) since the 2013 census, and an increase of 54 (5.8%) since the 2006 census. There were 507 males and 474 females, giving a sex ratio of 1.07 males per female. Ethnicities were 717 people  (72.9%) European/Pākehā, 438 (44.5%) Māori, 24 (2.4%) Pacific peoples, and 12 (1.2%) Asian (totals add to more than 100% since people could identify with multiple ethnicities). Of the total population, 234 people  (23.8%) were under 15 years old, 147 (14.9%) were 15–29, 438 (44.5%) were 30–64, and 165 (16.8%) were over 65.

Manaia-Kapuni

Manaia-Kapuni had a population of 1,551 at the 2018 New Zealand census, a decrease of 96 people (-5.8%) since the 2013 census, and a decrease of 69 people (-4.3%) since the 2006 census. There were 612 households. There were 792 males and 759 females, giving a sex ratio of 1.04 males per female. The median age was 37.9 years (compared with 37.4 years nationally), with 384 people (24.8%) aged under 15 years, 258 (16.6%) aged 15 to 29, 693 (44.7%) aged 30 to 64, and 216 (13.9%) aged 65 or older.

Ethnicities were 79.9% European/Pākehā, 36.2% Māori, 1.9% Pacific peoples, 1.4% Asian, and 1.2% other ethnicities (totals add to more than 100% since people could identify with multiple ethnicities).

The proportion of people born overseas was 6.8%, compared with 27.1% nationally.

Although some people objected to giving their religion, 58.0% had no religion, 30.9% were Christian, 0.2% were Buddhist and 2.1% had other religions.

Of those at least 15 years old, 84 (7.2%) people had a bachelor or higher degree, and 378 (32.4%) people had no formal qualifications. The median income was $28,500, compared with $31,800 nationally. The employment status of those at least 15 was that 552 (47.3%) people were employed full-time, 150 (12.9%) were part-time, and 75 (6.4%) were unemployed.

Education

In 2005, Tokaora School closed and merged with Manaia School.

References

Populated places in Taranaki
South Taranaki District